Charlie Chong (October 13, 1926 – April 26, 2007) was a populist Seattle political figure and activist on behalf of the Pike Place Market and against the marginalization of West Seattle.

Biography
On 13 October 1926, Chong was born on the island of Maui, then part of the Territory of Hawaii (now the State of Hawaii).

Chong graduated from Honolulu's St. Louis High School, and after service in the United States Army, studied at Georgetown University, where he edited the Foreign Service News Letter before receiving (in 1951) a Bachelor of Science degree in Foreign Service. He served in the United States Air Force in the Philippines, Korea, and Japan, 1951–1954.

After retiring from a varied career in public service positions and the canning industry, Chong came to public notice in the mid-1980s as an advocate of tenant rights at the Pike Place Market. From 1989 to 1993, he served as president of the Admiral Community Council and as West Seattle's representative on the Seattle Open Space Committee and Shoreline Parks Improvement Fund (SPIF).

In 1995, he ran as a protest candidate for City Council, and though he lost, he gained citywide name familiarity which enabled him to win a seat on the City Council the next year. In 1997 he ran for mayor, coming in second in the primary but losing to Paul Schell in the general election. (Seattle city offices are officially nonpartisan.) He was again an unsuccessful candidate for City Council in 1999.

Chong died in Seattle's Providence Hospital on April 26, 2007.

References

External links 
 Obituary (Seattle P-I)
 "About Charlie"

1926 births
Seattle City Council members
American politicians of Chinese descent
People from Maui
Walsh School of Foreign Service alumni
Pike Place Market
2007 deaths
20th-century American politicians
Asian-American people in Washington (state) politics